5-Fluoroorotic acid (5FOA) is a fluorinated derivative of the pyrimidine precursor orotic acid. It is used in yeast genetics to select for the absence of the URA3 gene, which encodes the enzyme for the decarboxylation of 5-fluoroorotic acid to 5-fluorouracil, a toxic metabolite. It has also been used in diatom selection.

See also
2-FA

References 

Pyrimidinediones
Fluorinated carboxylic acids